This is a list of texts written in classical Japanese, grouped by genres and in chronological order.

Genres

Buddhism
 Sangyō Gisho
 Shōmangyō Gisho (611)
 Yuimagyō Gisho (613)
 Hokke Gisho (615)
 Gangōji Garan Engi (747)
 Shin'yaku Kegonkyō Ongi Shiki (late Nara period)
 Sangō Shiiki (794)
 Ōjōyōshū (985)
 heike nōkyō (1164)
 Senchaku Hongan Nenbutsushū (1189)
 Shōbōgenzō (mid 13th century)
 Kyogyoshinsho (Kamakura period)
 Tannisho (late Kamakura period)
 Denkoroku (late Kamakura period)

Confucianism and philosophy
 Go Rin no Sho 1645
 Fudōchi Shinmyōroku (unknown)
 Rongo Shitsuchu (1600)
 Okina Mondō (1641)
 Daigaku Kuwakumon (1655–1658)
 Seikyo Yoroku (1665)
 Shugi Washo (1673)
 Gomo Jiki (1683)
 Banmin Tokuyo (early 16th century)
 Santokushō (early 16th century)
 Dojimon (1704)
 Shugi Gaisho (1709)
 Rongo Kogi (1712)
 Yojokun (1713)
 Seiyō Kibun (1715)
 Bendo (1717)
 Benmei (1717)
 Oritaku Shiba no Ki (started on 1716), finished before the writer's death on 1725)
 Seidan (written between 1716 and 1736)
 Tohi Mondo (1739)
 Shutsujo Kougo (1744)
 Shizen Shineido (partially published between 1751 and 1764)
 Kokuiko (1765)
 Naobinomitama (1771)
 Gengo (1775)
 Sobo Kigen (1788)
 Uiyamabumi (1799)
 Shutsujo Shogo (1811)
 Rangaku Kotohajime  (1814)
 Kyukeidan (1815)
 Yume no Shiro (1820)
 Kodo Taii (1824)
 Tsugi (completed on 1832, published on 1847)
 Senshin Dosakki (1833)
 Kyuo Dowa (1835)
 Jurinhyo (1836)
 Genshi Shiroku
 Genshiroku (1824)
 Genshi Koroku (1838)
 Genshi Banroku (1850)
 Genshi Tetsuroku (1852)
 Komo Yowa (1855)
 Ugen (1855)
 Bimiyu Genko (mid 19th century)
 Ninomiyaou Yowa (late 19th century)

Diary
 Nittō Guhō Junreikōki (836-847)
 Kanpyō Gyoki (887-897), written by Emperor Uda
 Teishin Kōki (908-948), written by Fujiwara no Tadahira
 Tosa Nikki (c. 935), written by Ki no Tsurayuki
 Kagerō Nikki (c. 974)
 Midō Kampakuki (998-1021), written by Fujiwara no Michinaga
 Gonki (991-1017), written by Fujiwara no Yukinari
 Shōyūki (982-1032), written by Fujiwara no Sanesuke
 Izumi Shikibu Nikki (1008), written by Izumi Shikibu
 Murasaki Shikibu Nikki (The Murasaki Shikibu Diary) (1008–10)
 Sarashina Nikki (1020–59)
 Shunki (1038–54), written by Fujiwara no Sukefusa
 Tokinoriki (1075–1108), written by Taira no Tokinori
 Gonijō Moromichi-ki (1083–99), written by Fujiwara no Moromichi
 Chūyūki (1087–1132), written by Fujiwara no Munetada
 Heihanki (1132–71), written by Taira no Nobunori
 Taiki (1136–55), written by Fujiwara no Yorinaga
 Gyokuyō (1164–1200), written by Fujiwara no Kanezane
 Meigetsuki (1180–1235), written by Fujiwara no Teika
 Heikoki (1196–1246), written by Taira no Tsunetaka
 Sanuki no Suke Nikki, written by Fujiwara no Chōshi
 Towazugatari (1271–1306), written by Go-Fukakusa In no Nijō
 Izayoi Nikki (c. 1283), written by Abutsu-ni
 Nakatsukasa no Naishi Nikki (1280–92), written by Fujiwara no Tsuneko
 Entairyaku (1311–60), written by Tōin Kinkata
 Hanazono Tennō Shinki (1310–32), written by Emperor Hanazono
 Kanmon Nikki (1416–48), written by Prince Sadafusa
 Sakkaiki (1418–48), written by Nakayama Sadachika
 Chikamoto Nikki (1465–86), written by Ninagawa Chikamoto
 Tokikuni Kyōki (1474–1502), written by Yamashina Tokikuni
 Sanetaka Kōki (1474–1536), written by Sanjōnishi Sanetaka
 Nobutane Kyōki (1480–1522), written by Nakamikado Nobutane
 Tokitsugu Kyōki (1527–76), written by Yamashina Tokitsugu
 Uwai Kakuken Nikki (1574–86), written by Uwai Satokane
 Tokitsune Kyōki (1576–1608), written by Yamashina Tokitsune
 Tamonnin Nikki (1478–1618), written by Eishun and others
 Honkō Kokushi Nikki (1610–33), written by Ishin Sūden

Dictionary, Encyclopedia
 Tenrei Banshō Meigi (830-835)
 Shinsen Jikyō (898-901)
 Wamyō Ruijushō (934)
 Ruiju Myōgishō (1081–1100)
 Iroha Jiruishō (1144–65)
 Jikyōshū (c. 1245)
 Kagakushū (1444)
 Setsuyōshū (1469–87)
 Onkochishinsho (1484)
 Wagokuhen (c. 1489)
 Nippo Jisho (1603)
 Wakan Sansai Zue (1713)

Fable and novel
 Suigakuki (late Nara period)
 Nihon Ryōiki (810-824)
 Yamato Monogatari (956)
 Sanpō Ekotoba (984)
 Nihon Ōjō Gokurakuki (985-986)
 Taketori Monogatari (early 10th century)
 Utsubo Monogatari (c. 989)
 Genji Monogatari (c. 1008)
 Honchō Hokke Genki (1040)
 Ise Monogatari (early Heian period)
 Hamamatsu Chūnagon Monogatari (late Heian period, late 11th century)
 Kohon Setsuwashū (late Heian period)
 Sagoromo Monogatari (late Heian period)
 Torikaebaya Monogatari (late Heian period)
 Yoru no Nezame (late Heian period)
 Heichū Monogatari (Heian period)
 Honchō Shinsenden (Heian Period)
 Ochikubo Monogatari (Heian period)
 Gōdanshō (1104–1108)
 Uchigikishū (1134?)
 Matsuuramiya Monogatari (1193?)
 Konjaku Monogatarishū (early 12th century)
 Tsutsumi Chūnagon Monogatari (late 12th century)
 Hobutsushu (early Kamakura period)
 Hosshinshū (early Kamakura period)
 Sumiyoshi Monogatari (early Kamakura period)
 Takamura Monogatari (late Heian to early Kamakura period)
 Uji Shūi Monogatari (early Kamakura period, early 13th century)
 Ima Monogatari (mid Kamakura period, after 1239)
 Towazugatari (late Kamakura period)
 Iwashimizu Monogatari (Kamakura period)
 Koke no Koromo (Kamakura period)
 Senjoshū (Kamakura period)
 Jikkunshō (1252)
 Kokin Chomonjo (1254)
 Shasekishū (1283)
 Otogizōshi (collected from Muromachi to Edo period)
 Kazashi no Himegimi (Muromachi period)
 Seisuishō (1628)
 Isoho Monogatari (Azuchi Momoyama period)
 Ugetsu Monogatari (1776)
 Ukiyoburo (1809–1813)
 Tōkaidōchū Hizakurige (1802–1814)

Go and shogi
 Igoshiki (1199)
 Shōgi Zushiki (1636), written by Ōhashi Sōko
 Sho Shōgi Zushiki (1694)
 Shōgi Rokushu no Zushiki (unknown)
 Igo Hatsuyōron (1713)
 Shogi Kenshoku (1804)

History
 Jūshichi-jō Kenpō (604)
 Kokki (620)
 Tennōki (620)
 Ōmiryō (668)
 Teiki (681)
 Asuka Kiyomihara Ritsuryō (681-689)
 Iki no Hakatoko no Sho (late 7th century)
 Taihō Ritsuryō (701) 
 Jōgū Shōtoku Hōō Teisetsu (c. 710)
 Kyūji (< 712)
 Kojiki (712)
 Yōrō Ritsuryō (718) 
 Nihon Shoki (720) 
 Fudoki (712-733?)
 Hitachi Fudoki (715)
 Harima no Kuni Fudoki (715)
 Bungo no Kuni Fudoki (>732)
 Izumu no Kuni Fudoki (733)
 Tōshi Kaden (c. 760–766)
 Takahashi Ujibumi (c. 789)
 Shoku Nihongi (797)
 Kogo Shūi (807)
 Shinsen Shōjiroku (815) 
 Nihon Kōki (840) 
 Shoku Nihon Kōki (869) 
 Nihon Montoku Tennō Jitsuroku (879) 
 Ruijū Kokushi (892) 
 Nihon Sandai Jitsuroku (901) 
 Engishiki (927) 
 Eiga Monogatari (late Heian period) 
 Ōkagami (late Heian period) 
 Kuji Hongi (Heian period)
 Shōmonki (c. 940)
 Fusō Ryakuki (12th century)
 Imakagami (c. 1170 and 1178) 
 Mizukagami (late 12th century) 
 Hogen Monogatari (1220?) 
 Azuma Kagami (late 13th century) 
 Shaku Nihongi (late 13th century) 
 Genpei Seisuiki (late Kamakura period) 
 Jinnō Shōtōki (1339?) 
 Heike Monogatari (1371) 
 Masukagami (1374?) 
 Taiheiki  (late 14th century) 
 Baishōron (Muromachi period)
 Gikeiki (Muromachi period) 
 Sandaiki (early Muromachi period)
 Soga Monogatari (early Muromachi period)
 Meitokuki (late Muromachi period)
 Gukanshō (1465) 
 Oninki (late 15th century)
 Shinchoki (1600?) - Commonly called Shinchokoki
 Shinchoki (1604)
 Mikawa Monogatari (1625–1626)
 Nihon Ōdai Ichiran (1652)
 Taikōki (1625–1661)
 Honchō Tsugan (1644–1647, 1670)
 Kouyou Gunkanki (early 17th century)
 Hankanfu (1702)
 Tokushi Yoron (1712)
 Koshitsu (1716)
 Sangoku Tsūran Zusetsu (1785)
 Kaikoku Heidan (1791)
 Keisei Hisaku (1789–1801)
 Saiiki Monogatari (around 18th century)
 Nihon Gaishi (early 18th century)
 Ryushi Shinron (mid 18th century)
 Kondo Hisaku (late Edo period)
 Nihon Seiki (late Edo period)
 Shinron (late Edo period)
 Shoku Hankanfu (1806)
 Yasou Dokugo (1806)
 Keikodan (1813)
 Shinkiron (1838)
 Yume Monogatari (1838) 
 Kaitenshishi (1844)
 Tokushi Zeigi (1852) 
 Seikenroku (1854)
 Shozan Taiwa (1864)
 Shozan Kanwa (1865)
 Hikawa Seiwa (1897)
 Dai Nihon Shi (started on 1657, completed on 1906)

Mathematics, science
 Ishinpō (984)
 Jinkōki (1627)
 Katsuyo Sanpo (mid Edo period)
 Kenkon Bensetsu (mid Edo period)
 Hatsubi Sanpō (1674)
 Kyuritsu (1836)
 Sekka Zusetsu (1835)
 Zoku Sekka Zusetsu (1840)

Poetry

Kanshi
Kaifūsō (751)
Ryōunshū (814)
Bunka Shūreishū (c. 818)
Keikokushū (827)
Fusōshū (c. 995–999)
 Wakan Rōeishū (c. 1013)
 Honchō Monzui (mid 11th century)
Gōrihōshū (c. 1071)
Wakankensakushū (1277–79)

Waka
 Bussokuseki-kahi (c. 753)
 Man'yōshū (>759)
Kakyō Hyōshiki (772)
Shinsen Man'yōshū (early 10th century)
Iseshū (after 939)
Amanotekorashū (late 10th century)
Tomonorishū (late 10th century)
Kingyoku Wakashū (1007–11)
Wakanrōeishū (1018)
Yorizaneshū (after 1044)
Zōkihōshishū (mid 11th century)
Shōryōshū (1078)
Gensanmi Yorimasashū (1173–78)
Chōshūeisō (1178)
Tsuneiekyōshū (c. 1182)
Sankashū (late 12th century)
Kinkai Wakashū (c. 1213)
Kenrei-mon In Ukyō No Daibu Shū (c. 1233)
Fūyō Wakashū (1271)
Wakankensakushū (1277–79)
Shokugenyō Wakashū (1323–24)
Shūgyokushū (c. 1328)
 Renri Hishō (c. 1349)
Tsukubashū (1356)
Shinyō Wakashū (1381)
Shinsen Tsukubashū (1495)
Kanginshū (1518)
Shinsen Inutsukubashū (after 1524)
Nijūichidaishū (21 imperial collections of Japanese poetry)
Kokin Wakashū (c. 920)
Gosen Wakashū (951)
Shūi Wakashū (1005–1007)
Goshūi Wakashū (1086)
Kin'yō Wakashū (1124–27)
Shika Wakashū (1151–54)
Senzai Wakashū (1187)
Shin Kokin Wakashū (1205)
Shinchokusen Wakashū (1234)
Shokugosen Wakashū (1251)
Shokukokin Wakashū (1265)
Shokushūi Wakashū (1278)
Shingosen Wakashū (1303)
Gyokuyō Wakashū (1313–14)
Shokusenzai Wakashū (1320)
Shokugoshūi Wakashū (1325–26)
Fūga Wakashū (1344–46)
Shinsenzai Wakashū (1359)
Shinshūi Wakashū (1364)
Shingoshūi Wakashū (1383–84)
Shinshokukokin Wakashū (1439)

Haikai
Fuyu no hi (1684)
Haru No Hi (1686)
Arano (1689)
Hisago (1690)
Sarumino (1691)
Sumidawara (1694)
Oku no Hosomichi (1702)

Zuihitsu
 Chiteiki (982)
 Makura no Sōshi (1002)
 Hōjōki (1212)
 Tsurezuregusa (c. 1330)

See also
 List of Japanese poetry anthologies
 List of National Treasures of Japan (writings)

Notes

References
 Brownlee, John S. (1997) Japanese historians and the national myths, 1600-1945: The Age of the Gods and Emperor Jimmu. Vancouver: University of British Columbia Press.   Tokyo: University of Tokyo Press. 
 Brownlee, John S.  (1991). Political Thought in Japanese Historical Writing: From Kojiki (712) to Tokushi Yoron (1712). Waterloo, Ontario: Wilfrid Laurier University Press. 

Classical